CHMOS refers to one of a series of Intel CMOS processes developed from their HMOS process (H stands for high-density).  It was first developed in 1981.

CHMOS was used in the Intel 80C51BH, a new version of their standard MCS-51 microcontroller.  The chip was also used in later versions of Intel 8086, and the 80C88, which were fully static version of the Intel 8088.  The Intel 80386 was made in 1.5 µm CHMOS III, and later in 1.0 µm CHMOS IV.

CHMOS III used 1.5 micron lithography, p-well processing, n-well processing, and two layers of metal.

CHMOS III-E used for the 12.5 MHz Intel 80C186 microprocessor.

CHMOS IV (H stands for High Speed) used 1.0 µm lithography.  Many versions of the Intel 80486 were made in 1.0 µm CHMOS IV.  

CHMOS V used 0.8 µm lithography and 3 metal layers, and was used in later versions of the 80386, 80486, and i860.

See also
 Depletion-load NMOS logic#Further development

References

Electronic design
Digital electronics
Integrated circuits
MOSFETs
Intel